Slesa may mean:
 Slesa, a ruined castle in Georgia
 Ślęża, a mountain in Poland
 Ślęza, a river in Poland